The 1997 Holiday Bowl was a college football bowl game played December 29, 1997, in San Diego, California. It was part of the 1997 NCAA Division I-A football season. It featured the Colorado State Rams from the Western Athletic Conference, and the Missouri Tigers from the Big 12 Conference.

Colorado State opened the scoring following a 14-yard touchdown run from running back Darran Hall, giving CSU an early 7–0 lead. Scott Knickman got Missouri on the board after he drilled a 32-yard field goal, getting Missouri within 7–3. In the second quarter, Missouri scored on a 4-yard touchdown run from quarterback Corby Jones, giving the Tigers a 10–7 lead.

Colorado State quarterback Moses Moreno found wide receiver Corey McCoy for a 22-yard touchdown pass, and Colorado State reclaimed the lead at 14–10. Missouri's Ernest Blackwell scored on a 7-yard touchdown run, again shifting the lead to the Tigers, 17–14.

In the third quarter, Colorado State reclaimed the lead following an 85-yard punt return from Darren Hall, putting the Rams up 21–17. Moses Moreno later found wide receiver Dallas Davis on a 47-yard pass to increase Colorado State's lead to 28–17. Missouri's Brock Olivo scored on a 3-yard touchdown run, pulling Missouri to within 28–24. Ryan Eslinger's 23-yard touchdown run gave Colorado State a 35–24 lead, and the final score held up.

References

Holiday Bowl
Holiday Bowl
Colorado State Rams football bowl games
Missouri Tigers football bowl games
1997 in sports in California